Tapio Wartiovaara (18 May 1909 – 20 February 1940) was a Finnish sports shooter. He competed in the 50 m pistol event at the 1936 Summer Olympics. He died from his wounds after fighting in the Battle of Taipale.

References

1909 births
1940 deaths
Finnish male sport shooters
Olympic shooters of Finland
Shooters at the 1936 Summer Olympics
Sportspeople from Helsinki
Finnish military personnel killed in World War II